Filly Brown is a 2012 drama film directed by Youssef Delara and Michael D. Olmos. It was nominated for the Grand Jury Prize at the 2012 Sundance Film Festival and won Best Feature Film at the 2013 Noor Iranian Film Festival. The whole cast won the award Special Achievement in Film at the 2013 American Latino Media Arts Awards, or ALMA Award and the late Jenni Rivera was also given a moment of silence. This was Rivera's first and only film before her death on December 9, 2012.

Cast

 Gina Rodriguez as Maria José “Majo” Tenorio
 Jenni Rivera as Maria Tenorio
 Lou Diamond Phillips as Jose Tenorio
 Edward James Olmos as Leandro
 Emilio Rivera as Mani
 Noel Gugliemi as Big Cee
 Baby Bash as Caeser

Reception
On review aggregator website Rotten Tomatoes, the film holds an approval rating of 45% based on 11 reviews, and an average rating of 5.5/10. On Metacritic, the film has a weighted average score of 57 out of 100, based on 7 critics, indicating "mixed or average reviews".

References

External links
 
 

2012 films
2012 drama films
American drama films
2010s English-language films
2010s American films